The Fraser River  is the longest river within British Columbia, Canada, rising at Fraser Pass near Blackrock Mountain in the Rocky Mountains and flowing for , into the Strait of Georgia just south of the City of Vancouver.

Naming 
The river is named after Simon Fraser, who led an expedition in 1808 on behalf of the North West Company from the site of present-day Prince George almost to the mouth of the river.

Course

The Fraser drains a  area. Its source is a dripping spring at Fraser Pass in the Canadian Rocky Mountains near the border with Alberta. The river then flows north to the Yellowhead Highway and west past Mount Robson to the Rocky Mountain Trench and the Robson Valley near Valemount. After running northwest past 54° north, it makes a sharp turn to the south at Giscome Portage, meeting the Nechako River at the city of Prince George, then continues south, progressively cutting deeper into the Fraser Plateau to form the Fraser Canyon from roughly the confluence of the Chilcotin River, near the city of Williams Lake, southwards.

From Lytton southwards it runs through a progressively deeper canyon between the Lillooet Ranges of the Coast Mountains on its west and the Cascade Range on its east. Hell's Gate, located immediately downstream of the town of Boston Bar, is a famous portion of the canyon where the walls narrow dramatically, forcing the entire volume of the river through a gap only 35 metres (115 feet) wide. An aerial tramway takes visitors out over the river. Simon Fraser was forced to portage the gorge on his trip through the canyon in June 1808. 

At Yale, at the head of navigation on the river, the canyon opens up and the river widens, though without much adjoining lowland until Hope, where the river then turns west and southwest into the Fraser Valley, a lush lowland valley, and runs past Chilliwack and the confluence of the Harrison and Sumas Rivers, bending northwest at Abbotsford and Mission.

The Fraser then flows past Maple Ridge, Pitt Meadows, Port Coquitlam, and north Surrey. It turns southwest again just east of New Westminster, where it splits into the North Arm, which is the southern boundary of the City of  Vancouver, and the South Arm, which divides the City of Richmond from the City of Delta to the south. Richmond is on the largest island in the Fraser, Lulu Island and also on Sea Island, which is the location of Vancouver International Airport, where the Middle Arm branches off to the south from the North Arm. The far eastern end of Lulu Island is named Queensborough and is part of the City of New Westminster. Also in the lowermost Fraser, among other smaller islands, is Annacis Island, an important industrial and port area, which lies to the southeast of the eastern end of Lulu Island. Other notable islands in the lower Fraser are Barnston Island, Matsqui Island, Nicomen Island and Sea Bird Island. Other islands lie on the outer side of the estuary, most notably Westham Island, a wildfowl preserve, and Iona Island, the location of the main sewage plant for the City of Vancouver.

After 100 kilometres (about 60 mi), the Fraser forms a delta where it empties into the Strait of Georgia between the mainland and Vancouver Island. The lands south of the City of Vancouver, including the cities of Richmond and Delta, sit on the flat flood plain. The islands of the delta include Iona Island, Sea Island, Lulu Island, Annacis Island, and a number of smaller islands. While the vast majority of the river's drainage basin lies within British Columbia, a small portion in the drainage basin lies across the international border in Washington in the United States, namely the upper reaches of the tributary Chilliwack and Sumas rivers.  Most of lowland Whatcom County, Washington is part of the Fraser Lowland and was formed also by sediment deposited from the Fraser, though most of the county is not in the Fraser drainage basin.

Similar to the Columbia River Gorge east of Portland, Oregon, the Fraser exploits a topographic cleft between two mountain ranges separating a more continental climate (in this case, that of the British Columbia Interior) from a milder climate near the coast. When an Arctic high-pressure area moves into the British Columbia Interior and a relatively low-pressure area builds over the general Puget Sound and Strait of Georgia region, the cold Arctic air accelerates southwest through the Fraser Canyon. Such winds frequently reach Bellingham and the San Juan Islands, gaining strength over the open water of the Strait of Juan de Fuca.

The estuary at the river's mouth is a site of hemispheric importance in the Western Hemisphere Shorebird Reserve Network.

Discharge
The Water Survey of Canada currently operates 17 gauge stations that measure discharge and water level along the majority of the mainstem from Red Pass just downstream of Moose Lake in the Mount Robson Provincial Park, to Steveston in Vancouver at the river mouth. The average flow is highly seasonal; summer discharge rates can be ten times larger than the flow during the winter.

The Fraser's highest recorded flow, in June 1894, is estimated to have been  at Hope. It was calculated using high-water marks near the hydrometric station at Hope and various statistical methods. In 1948 the Fraser River Board adopted the estimate for the 1894 flood. It remains the value specified by regulatory agencies for all flood control work on the river.

History

On June 14, 1792, the Spanish explorers Dionisio Alcalá Galiano and Cayetano Valdés entered and anchored in the North Arm of the Fraser River, becoming the first Europeans to find and enter it. The existence of the river, but not its location, had been deduced during the 1791 voyage of José María Narváez, under Francisco de Eliza.

The upper reaches of the Fraser River were first explored by Sir Alexander Mackenzie in 1793, and fully traced by Simon Fraser in 1808, who confirmed that it was not connected with the Columbia River.

The lower Fraser was revisited in 1824 when the Hudson Bay Company sent a crew across Pudget Sound from its Fort George southern post located on the Columbia River. The expedition was led by James McMillan. The Fraser was reached via the Nicomekl River and the Salmon River reachable after a portage. Friendly tribes met earlier on by the Simon Fraser crew were reacquainted with. A trading post with agricultural potential was to be located.

By 1827, a crew was sent back via the mouth of the Fraser to build and operate the original Fort Langley. McMillan also led the undertaking.
The trading post original location would soon become the first ever mixed ancestry and agricultural settlement in southern British Columbia on the Fraser (Sto:lo) river.

In 1828 George Simpson visited the river, mainly to examine Fort Langley and determine whether it would be suitable as the Hudson's Bay Company's main Pacific depot. Simpson had believed the Fraser River might be navigable throughout its length, even though Simon Fraser had described it as non-navigable. Simpson journeyed down the river and through the Fraser Canyon and afterwards wrote "I should consider the passage down, to be certain Death, in nine attempts out of Ten. I shall therefore no longer talk about it as a navigable stream". His trip down the river convinced him that Fort Langley could not replace Fort Vancouver as the company's main depot on the Pacific coast.

Much of British Columbia's history has been bound to the Fraser, partly because it was the essential route between the Interior and the Lower Coast after the loss of the lands south of the 49th Parallel with the Oregon Treaty of 1846. It was the site of its first recorded settlements of Aboriginal people (see Musqueam, St'at'imc, Secwepemc and Nlaka'pamŭ), the site of the first European-Indigenous mixed ancestry settlement in southern British-Columbia (see Fort Langley), the route of multitudes of prospectors during the Fraser Canyon Gold Rush and the main vehicle of the province's early commerce and industry.

In 1998, the river was designated as a Canadian Heritage River for its natural and human heritage. It remains the longest river with that designation.

Uses

The Fraser is heavily exploited by human activities, especially in its lower reaches. Its banks are rich farmland, its water is used by pulp mills, and a few dams on some tributaries provide hydroelectric power. The main flow of the Fraser has never been dammed partly because its high level of sediment flows would result in a short dam lifespan, but mostly because of strong opposition from fisheries and other environmental concerns. In 1858, the Fraser River and surrounding areas were occupied when the gold rush came to the Fraser Canyon and the Fraser River. It is also a popular fishing location for residents of the Lower Mainland.

The delta of the river, especially in the Boundary Bay area, is an important stopover location for migrating shorebirds.

The Fraser Herald, a regional position within the Canadian Heraldic Authority is named after the river.

Fishing
The Fraser River is known for the fishing of white sturgeon, all five species of Pacific salmon (chinook, coho, chum, pink, sockeye), as well as steelhead trout. The Fraser River is also the largest producer of salmon in Canada.
It was estimated to be over 100 years old. The fish was tagged and released.

Flooding
The most significant Fraser river floods in recorded history occurred in 1894 and 1948.

1894 flood

After European settlement, the first disastrous flood in the Lower Mainland (Fraser Valley and Metro Vancouver) occurred in 1894. With no protection against the rising waters of the Fraser River, Fraser Valley and Metro Vancouver communities from Chilliwack downstream were inundated with water. In the 1894 floods, the water mark at Mission reached .

After the 1894 flood, a dyking system was constructed throughout the Fraser Valley. The dyking and drainage projects greatly improved the flood problems, but unfortunately over time, the dykes were allowed to fall into disrepair and became overgrown with brush and trees. With some dykes constructed of a wooden frame, they gave way in 1948 in several locations, marking the second disastrous flood. Flooding since 1948 has been minor in comparison.

1948 flood

1948 saw massive flooding in Chilliwack and other areas along the Fraser River. The peak flow was about 15,600 cubic meters per second.

Timeline

On May 28, 1948, the Semiault Creek Dyke broke.
On May 29, 1948, dykes near Glendale (now Cottonwood Corners) gave way and in four days,  of fertile ground were under water.
On June 1, 1948, the Cannor Dyke (east of Vedder Canal near Trans Canada Highway) broke and released tons of Fraser River water onto the Greendale area, destroying homes and fields.
On June 3, 1948, the steamer Gladys supplied flood-stricken Chilliwack with tents and provisions as well as moving people and stock onto high ground.

Causes
Cool temperatures in March, April, and early May had delayed the melting of the heavy snowpack that had accumulated over the winter season. Several days of hot weather and warm rains over the holiday weekend in late May hastened the thawing of the snowpack. Rivers and streams quickly swelled with spring runoff, reaching heights surpassed only in 1894. Finally, the poorly maintained dyke systems failed to contain the water.

At the height of the 1948 flood,  stood under water. Dykes broke at Agassiz, Chiliwack, Nicomen Island, Glen Valley and Matsqui. When the flood waters receded a month later, 16,000 people had been evacuated, with damages totaling $20 million, about $225 million in 2020 dollars.

1972 flood
Major flooding occurred once again in 1972 due to a significant spring freshet, primarily impacting regions around Prince George, Kamloops, Hope and Surrey.

2007 flood
Due to record snowpacks on the mountains in the Fraser River catch basin which began melting, combined with heavy rainfall, water levels on the Fraser River rose in 2007 to a level not reached since 1972. Low-lying land in areas upriver such as Prince George suffered minor flooding. Evacuation alerts were given for the low-lying areas not protected by dikes in the Lower Mainland. However, the water levels did not breach the dikes, and major flooding was averted.

2021 flood

Major flooding occurred in November 2021 as part of the November 2021 Pacific Northwest floods.

Tributaries 

Tributaries are listed from the mouth of the Fraser and going up river.

See also
 List of crossings of the Fraser River
 List of crossings of the Thompson River
 List of crossings of the Nechako River
 List of longest rivers of Canada
 French Bar Canyon
 Fraser Canyon
 List of British Columbia rivers
 Moran Dam (proposal)
 Vanport Oregon flood May 30, 1948

References

Further reading

The Fraser, Bruce Hutchison, 1950, classic work by noted BC editor and publisher

External links

Map and photographs

 
Rivers of British Columbia
Rivers of the Pacific Ranges
Rivers of the Canadian Rockies
Canadian Heritage Rivers
Canadian Cascades
Interior of British Columbia
Landforms of Vancouver
South Coast of British Columbia
Floods in Canada
Drainage basins of the Pacific Ocean
Ramsar sites in Canada
Braided rivers